The Hettinger County Courthouse in Mott, North Dakota was built in 1934. It was listed on the National Register of Historic Places in 1985.

Its construction, during 1934–36, was barely allowed by passage of a bond issue to take advantage of a Public Works Administration grant.

It is significant for its Art Deco architecture, along with that of the Stark County Courthouse.

References

Courthouses on the National Register of Historic Places in North Dakota
County courthouses in North Dakota
Art Deco architecture in North Dakota
Government buildings completed in 1934
National Register of Historic Places in Hettinger County, North Dakota
1934 establishments in North Dakota